The cheetah (Acinonyx jubatus) is a large cat native to Africa and Southwest Asia (today restricted to central Iran). Its head is small and rounded, with a short snout and black tear-like facial streaks. The coat is typically tawny to creamy white or pale buff and is mostly covered with evenly spaced, solid black spots. Four subspecies are recognised.

The cheetah lives in three main social groups: females and their cubs, male "coalitions", and solitary males. While females lead a nomadic life searching for prey in large home ranges, males are more sedentary and instead establish much smaller territories in areas with plentiful prey and access to females. The cheetah is active  during the day, with peaks during dawn and dusk. It feeds on small- to medium-sized prey, mostly weighing under , and prefers medium-sized ungulates such as impala, springbok and Thomson's gazelles. The cheetah typically stalks its prey within  before charging towards it, trips it during the chase and bites its throat to suffocate it to death. It breeds throughout the year. After a gestation of nearly three months, a litter of typically three or four cubs is born. Cheetah cubs are highly vulnerable to predation by other large carnivores such as hyenas and lions. They are weaned at around four months and are independent by around 20 months of age.

The cheetah occurs in a variety of habitats such as savannahs in the Serengeti, arid mountain ranges in the Sahara and hilly desert terrain in Iran. The cheetah is threatened by several factors such as habitat loss, conflict with humans, poaching and high susceptibility to diseases. Historically ranging throughout most of Sub-Saharan Africa and extending eastward into the Middle East and to central India, the cheetah is now distributed mainly in small, fragmented populations in central Iran and southern, eastern and northwestern Africa. In 2016, the global cheetah population was estimated at 7,100 individuals in the wild; it is listed as Vulnerable on the IUCN Red List. In September 2022, they were reintroduced to India after being extinct in the country for 70 years. In the past, cheetahs were tamed and trained for hunting ungulates. They have been widely depicted in art, literature, advertising, and animation.

Etymology
This in turn comes from  meaning 'variegated', 'adorned' or 'painted'. In the past, the cheetah was often called "hunting leopard" because they could be tamed and used for coursing. The generic name Acinonyx probably derives from the combination of two Greek words:  meaning 'unmoved' or 'motionless', and  meaning 'nail' or 'hoof'. A rough translation is "immobile nails", a reference to the cheetah's limited ability to retract its claws. A similar meaning can be obtained by the combination of the Greek prefix a– (implying a lack of) and  meaning 'to move' or 'to set in motion'. The specific name  is Latin for 'crested, having a mane'.

A few old generic names such as Cynailurus and Cynofelis allude to the similarities between the cheetah and canids.

Taxonomy

In 1777, Johann Christian Daniel von Schreber described the cheetah based on a skin from the Cape of Good Hope and gave it the scientific name Felis jubatus. Joshua Brookes proposed the generic name Acinonyx in 1828. In 1917, Reginald Innes Pocock placed the cheetah in a subfamily of its own, Acinonychinae, given its striking morphological resemblance to the greyhound and significant deviation from typical felid features; the cheetah was classified in Felinae in later taxonomic revisions.

In the 19th and 20th centuries, several cheetah specimens were described; some were proposed as subspecies. An example is the South African specimen known as the "woolly cheetah", named for its notably dense fur—this was described as a new species (Felis lanea) by Philip Sclater in 1877, but the classification was mostly disputed. There has been considerable confusion in the nomenclature of cheetahs and leopards (Panthera pardus) as authors often confused the two; some considered "hunting leopards" an independent species, or equal to the leopard.

Subspecies

In 1975, five subspecies were considered valid taxa: A. j. hecki, A. j. jubatus, A. j. raineyi, A. j. soemmeringii and A. j. venaticus. In 2011, a phylogeographic study found minimal genetic variation between A. j. jubatus and A. j. raineyi; only four subspecies were identified. In 2017, the Cat Classification Task Force of the IUCN Cat Specialist Group revised felid taxonomy and recognised these four subspecies as valid. Their details are tabulated below:

Phylogeny and evolution

The cheetah's closest relatives are the cougar (Puma concolor) and the jaguarundi (Herpailurus yagouaroundi). Together, these three species form the Puma lineage, one of the eight lineages of the extant felids; the Puma lineage diverged from the rest 6.7 mya. The sister group of the Puma lineage is a clade of smaller Old World cats that includes the genera Felis, Otocolobus and Prionailurus.

The oldest cheetah fossils, excavated in eastern and southern Africa, date to 3.5–3 mya; the earliest known specimen from South Africa is from the lowermost deposits of the Silberberg Grotto (Sterkfontein). Though incomplete, these fossils indicate forms larger but less cursorial than the modern cheetah. Fossil remains from Europe are limited to a few Middle Pleistocene specimens from Hundsheim (Austria) and Mosbach Sands (Germany). Cheetah-like cats are known from as late as 10,000 years ago from the Old World. The giant cheetah (A. pardinensis), significantly larger and slower compared to the modern cheetah, occurred in Eurasia and eastern and southern Africa in the Villafranchian period roughly 3.8–1.9 mya. In the Middle Pleistocene a smaller cheetah, A. intermedius, ranged from Europe to China. The modern cheetah appeared in Africa around 1.9 mya; its fossil record is restricted to Africa.

Extinct North American cheetah-like cats had historically been classified in Felis, Puma or Acinonyx; two such species, F. studeri and F. trumani, were considered to be closer to the puma than the cheetah, despite their close similarities to the latter. Noting this, palaeontologist Daniel Adams proposed Miracinonyx, a new subgenus under Acinonyx, in 1979 for the North American cheetah-like cats; this was later elevated to genus rank. Adams pointed out that North American and Old World cheetah-like cats may have had a common ancestor, and Acinonyx might have originated in North America instead of Eurasia. However, subsequent research has shown that Miracinonyx is phylogenetically closer to the cougar than the cheetah; the similarities to cheetahs have been attributed to convergent evolution.

The three species of the Puma lineage may have had a common ancestor during the Miocene (roughly 8.25 mya). Some suggest that North American cheetahs possibly migrated to Asia via the Bering Strait, then dispersed southward to Africa through Eurasia at least 100,000 years ago; some authors have expressed doubt over the occurrence of cheetah-like cats in North America, and instead suppose the modern cheetah to have evolved from Asian populations that eventually spread to Africa. The cheetah is thought to have experienced two population bottlenecks that greatly decreased the genetic variability in populations; one occurred about 100,000 years ago that has been correlated to migration from North America to Asia, and the second 10,000–12,000 years ago in Africa, possibly as part of the Late Pleistocene extinction event.

Genetics
The diploid number of chromosomes in the cheetah is 38, the same as in most other felids. The cheetah was the first felid observed to have unusually low genetic variability among individuals, which has led to poor breeding in captivity, increased spermatozoal defects, high juvenile mortality and increased susceptibility to diseases and infections. A prominent instance was the deadly feline coronavirus outbreak in a cheetah breeding facility of Oregon in 1983 which had a mortality rate of 60%—higher than that recorded for previous epizootics of feline infectious peritonitis in any felid. The remarkable homogeneity in cheetah genes has been demonstrated by experiments involving the major histocompatibility complex (MHC); unless the MHC genes are highly homogeneous in a population, skin grafts exchanged between a pair of unrelated individuals would be rejected. Skin grafts exchanged between unrelated cheetahs are accepted well and heal, as if their genetic makeup were the same.

The low genetic diversity is thought to have been created by two population bottlenecks from c. 100,000 years and c. 12,000 years ago, respectively. The resultant level of genetic variation is around 0.1–4% of average living species, lower than that of Tasmanian devils, Virunga gorillas, Amur tigers, and even highly inbred domestic cats and dogs.

King cheetah

The king cheetah is a variety of cheetah with a rare mutation for cream-coloured fur marked with large, blotchy spots and three dark, wide stripes extending from the neck to the tail. In Manicaland, Zimbabwe, it was known as nsuifisi and thought to be a cross between a leopard and a hyena. In 1926 Major A. Cooper wrote about a cheetah-like animal he had shot near modern-day Harare, with fur as thick as that of a snow leopard and spots that merged to form stripes. He suggested it could be a cross between a leopard and a cheetah. As more such individuals were observed it was seen that they had non-retractable claws like the cheetah.

In 1927, Pocock described these individuals as a new species by the name of Acinonyx rex ("king cheetah"). However, in the absence of proof to support his claim, he withdrew his proposal in 1939. Abel Chapman considered it a colour morph of the normally spotted cheetah. Since 1927 the king cheetah has been reported five more times in the wild in Zimbabwe, Botswana and northern Transvaal; one was photographed in 1975.

In 1981, two female cheetahs that had mated with a wild male from Transvaal at the De Wildt Cheetah and Wildlife Centre (South Africa) gave birth to one king cheetah each; subsequently, more king cheetahs were born at the centre. In 2012, the cause of this coat pattern was found to be a mutation in the gene for transmembrane aminopeptidase  (Taqpep), the same gene responsible for the striped "mackerel" versus blotchy "classic" pattern seen in tabby cats. The appearance is caused by reinforcement of a recessive allele; hence if two mating cheetahs are heterozygous carriers of the mutated allele, a quarter of their offspring can be expected to be king cheetahs.

Characteristics

The cheetah is a lightly built, spotted cat characterised by a small rounded head, a short snout, black tear-like facial streaks, a deep chest, long thin legs and a long tail. Its slender, canine-like form is highly adapted for speed, and contrasts sharply with the robust build of the genus Panthera. Cheetahs are sexually dimorphic, with males larger and heavier than females, but not to the extent seen in other large cats. Studies differ significantly on morphological variations among the subspecies.

The coat is typically tawny to creamy white or pale buff (darker in the mid-back portion). The chin, throat and underparts of the legs and the belly are white and devoid of markings. Each cheetah has a distinct pattern of spots which can be used to identify unique individuals. Besides the clearly visible spots, there are other faint, irregular black marks on the coat. Newly born cubs are covered in fur with an unclear pattern of spots that gives them a dark appearance—pale white above and nearly black on the underside. The hair is mostly short and often coarse, but the chest and the belly are covered in soft fur; the fur of king cheetahs has been reported to be silky. There is a short, rough mane, covering at least  along the neck and the shoulders; this feature is more prominent in males. The mane starts out as a cape of long, loose blue to grey hair in juveniles. Melanistic cheetahs are rare and have been seen in Zambia and Zimbabwe. In 1877–1878, Sclater described two partially albino specimens from South Africa.

The head is small and more rounded compared to other big cats. Saharan cheetahs have canine-like slim faces. The ears are small, short and rounded; they are tawny at the base and on the edges and marked with black patches on the back. The eyes are set high and have round pupils. The whiskers, shorter and fewer than those of other felids, are fine and inconspicuous. The pronounced tear streaks (or malar stripes), unique to the cheetah, originate from the corners of the eyes and run down the nose to the mouth. The role of these streaks is not well understood—they may protect the eyes from the sun's glare (a helpful feature as the cheetah hunts mainly during the day), or they could be used to define facial expressions. The exceptionally long and muscular tail, with a bushy white tuft at the end, measures . While the first two-thirds of the tail are covered in spots, the final third is marked with four to six dark rings or stripes.

The cheetah is superficially similar to the leopard, which has a larger head, fully retractable claws, rosettes instead of spots, lacks tear streaks and is more muscular. Moreover, the cheetah is taller than the leopard. The serval also resembles the cheetah in physical build, but is significantly smaller, has a shorter tail and its spots fuse to form stripes on the back. The cheetah appears to have evolved convergently with canids in morphology and behaviour; it has canine-like features such as a relatively long snout, long legs, a deep chest, tough paw pads and blunt, semi-retractable claws. The cheetah has often been likened to the greyhound, as both have similar morphology and the ability to reach tremendous speeds in a shorter time than other mammals, but the cheetah can attain much higher maximum speeds.

Internal anatomy

Sharply contrasting with the other big cats in its morphology, the cheetah shows several specialized adaptations for prolonged chases to catch prey at some of the fastest speeds reached by land animals. Its light, streamlined body makes it well-suited to short, explosive bursts of speed, rapid acceleration, and an ability to execute extreme changes in direction while moving at high speed. The large nasal passages, accommodated well due to the smaller size of the canine teeth, ensure fast flow of sufficient air, and the enlarged heart and lungs allow the enrichment of blood with oxygen in a short time. This allows cheetahs to rapidly regain their stamina after a chase. During a typical chase, their respiratory rate increases from 60 to 150 breaths per minute. Moreover, the reduced viscosity of the blood at higher temperatures (common in frequently moving muscles) could ease blood flow and increase oxygen transport. While running, in addition to having good traction due to their semi-retractable claws, cheetahs use their tail as a rudder-like means of steering that enables them to make sharp turns, necessary to outflank antelopes which often change direction to escape during a chase. The protracted claws increase grip over the ground, while rough paw pads make the sprint more convenient over tough ground. The limbs of the cheetah are longer than what is typical for other cats its size; the thigh muscles are large, and the tibia and fibula are held close together making the lower legs less likely to rotate. This reduces the risk of losing balance during runs, but compromises the cat's ability to climb trees. The highly reduced clavicle is connected through ligaments to the scapula, whose pendulum-like motion increases the stride length and assists in shock absorption.

The cheetah resembles the smaller cats in cranial features, and in having a long and flexible spine, as opposed to the stiff and short one in other large felids. The roughly triangular skull has light, narrow bones and the sagittal crest is poorly developed, possibly to reduce weight and enhance speed. The mouth can not be opened as widely as in other cats given the shorter length of muscles between the jaw and the skull. A study suggested that the limited retraction of the cheetah's claws may result from the earlier truncation of the development of the middle phalanx bone in cheetahs.

The sharp, narrow carnassials are larger than those of leopards and lions, suggesting the cheetah can consume larger amount of food in a given time period. The small, flat canines are used to bite the throat and suffocate the prey. A study gave the bite force quotient (BFQ) of the cheetah as 119, close to that for the lion (112), suggesting that adaptations for a lighter skull may not have reduced the power of the cheetah's bite. Unlike other cats, the cheetah's canines have no gap behind them when the jaws close, as the top and bottom cheek teeth show extensive overlap; this equips the upper and lower teeth to effectively tear through the meat. The slightly curved claws, shorter and straighter than those of other cats, lack a protective sheath and are partly retractable. The claws are blunt due to lack of protection, but the large and strongly curved dewclaw is remarkably sharp. Cheetahs have a high concentration of nerve cells arranged in a band in the centre of the eyes, a visual streak, the most efficient among felids. This significantly sharpens the vision and enables the cheetah to swiftly locate prey against the horizon. The cheetah is unable to roar due to the presence of a sharp-edged vocal fold within the larynx.

Speed and acceleration

The cheetah is the world's fastest land animal.

Contrary to the common belief that cheetahs hunt by simply chasing its prey at high speeds, the findings of two studies in 2013 observing hunting cheetahs using GPS collars show that cheetahs hunt at speeds much lower than the highest recorded for them during most of the chase, interspersed with a few short bursts (lasting only seconds) when they attain peak speeds. The researchers suggested that a hunt consists of two phases—an initial fast acceleration phase when the cheetah tries to catch up with the prey, followed by slowing down as it closes in on it, the deceleration varying by the prey in question. Speed and acceleration values for a hunting cheetah may be different from those for a non-hunter because while engaged in the chase, the cheetah is more likely to be twisting and turning and may be running through vegetation.

One stride of a galloping cheetah measures ; the stride length and the number of jumps increases with speed. During more than half the duration of the sprint, the cheetah has all four limbs in the air, increasing the stride length. Running cheetahs can retain up to 90% of the heat generated during the chase. A 1973 study suggested the length of the sprint is limited by excessive build-up of body heat when the body temperature reaches . However, a 2013 study recorded the average temperature of cheetahs after hunts to be , suggesting high temperatures need not cause hunts to be abandoned.

It was therefore discredited for a faulty method of measurement.
Again dividing the distance by time, but this time to determine the maximum sustained speed, completing the runs in an average time of 7 seconds. Being a more accurate method of measurement, this test was made in 1965 but published in 1997.
Subsequently with GPS-IMU collars, running speed was measured for wild cheetahs during hunts with turns and maneuvers, and the maximum speed recorded was  sustained for 1–2 seconds. The speed was obtained by dividing the length by the time between footfalls of a stride.

There are indirect ways to realize how fast are cheetah running. One case is known of a cheetah that overtook a young male Pronghorn. Cheetahs can overtake a running antelope with head start of 150 yards (137.2 meters). Both animals are assumed to be clocked at 50 mph (80 Km/h) by speedometer reading when running alongside a vehicle at full gallop.

The physiological reasons for speed in cheetahs are:

-A tibia and radius as long as or longer than the femur and humerus.

-Small head and long lumbar spine (As long as or longer than the dorsal spine).

-Elongated and slender long bones of the limbs in general, as well as the pelvis, specially the ischium.

-A higher concentration of fast-twich muscle fibers than other cats and animals in general.

-Enlarged respiratory passages that allow it to inhale and exhale more air with each breath, as well as helping to dissipate body heat (Along with it cool nose).

Ecology and behaviour
Cheetahs are active mainly during the day, whereas other carnivores such as leopards and lions are active mainly at night; These larger carnivores can kill cheetahs and steal their kills; hence, the diurnal tendency of cheetahs helps them avoid larger predators in areas where they are sympatric, such as the Okavango Delta. In areas where the cheetah is the major predator (such as farmlands in Botswana and Namibia), activity tends to increase at night. This may also happen in highly arid regions such as the Sahara, where daytime temperatures can reach . The lunar cycle can also influence the cheetah's routine—activity might increase on moonlit nights as prey can be sighted easily, though this comes with the danger of encountering larger predators. Hunting is the major activity throughout the day, with peaks during dawn and dusk. Groups rest in grassy clearings after dusk. Cheetahs often inspect their vicinity at observation points such as elevations to check for prey or larger carnivores; even while resting, they take turns at keeping a lookout.

Social organisation

Cheetahs have a flexible and complex social structure and tend to be more gregarious than several other cats (except the lion). Individuals typically avoid one another but are generally amicable; males may fight over territories or access to females in oestrus, and on rare occasions such fights can result in severe injury and death. Females are not social and have minimal interaction with other individuals, barring the interaction with males when they enter their territories or during the mating season. Some females, generally mother and offspring or siblings, may rest beside one another during the day. Females tend to lead a solitary life or live with offspring in undefended home ranges; young females often stay close to their mothers for life but young males leave their mother's range to live elsewhere.

Some males are territorial, and group together for life, forming coalitions that collectively defend a territory which ensures maximum access to females—this is unlike the behaviour of the male lion who mates with a particular group (pride) of females. In most cases, a coalition will consist of brothers born in the same litter who stayed together after weaning, but biologically unrelated males are often allowed into the group; in the Serengeti 30% members in coalitions are unrelated males. If a cub is the only male in a litter he will typically join an existing group, or form a small group of solitary males with two or three other lone males who may or may not be territorial. In the Kalahari Desert around 40% of the males live in solitude.

Males in a coalition are affectionate toward each other, grooming mutually and calling out if any member is lost; unrelated males may face some aversion in their initial days in the group. All males in the coalition typically have equal access to kills when the group hunts together, and possibly also to females who may enter their territory. A coalition generally has a greater chance of encountering and acquiring females for mating, however, its large membership demands greater resources than do solitary males. A 1987 study showed that solitary and grouped males have a nearly equal chance of coming across females, but the males in coalitions are notably healthier and have better chances of survival than their solitary counterparts.

Home ranges and territories
Unlike many other felids, among cheetahs, females tend to occupy larger areas compared to males. Females typically disperse over large areas in pursuit of prey, but they are less nomadic and roam in a smaller area if prey availability in the area is high. As such, the size of their home range depends on the distribution of prey in a region.

Males are generally less nomadic than females; often males in coalitions (and sometimes solitary males staying far from coalitions) establish territories. Whether males settle in territories or disperse over large areas forming home ranges depends primarily on the movements of females. Territoriality is preferred only if females tend to be more sedentary, which is more feasible in areas with plenty of prey. Some males, called floaters, switch between territoriality and nomadism depending on the availability of females. A 1987 study showed territoriality depended on the size and age of males and the membership of the coalition. In the Kruger National Park (South Africa) territories were much smaller. When a female enters a territory, the males will surround her; if she tries to escape, the males will bite or snap at her. Generally, the female can not escape on her own; the males themselves leave after they lose interest in her. They may smell the spot she was sitting or lying on to determine if she was in oestrus.

Communication

The cheetah is a vocal felid with a broad repertoire of calls and sounds; the acoustic features and the use of many of these have been studied in detail. The vocal characteristics, such as the way they are produced, are often different from those of other cats. For instance, a study showed that exhalation is louder than inhalation in cheetahs, while no such distinction was observed in the domestic cat. Listed below are some commonly recorded vocalisations observed in cheetahs:

 Chirping: A chirp (or a "stutter-bark") is an intense bird-like call and lasts less than a second. Cheetahs chirp when they are excited, for instance, when gathered around a kill. Other uses include summoning concealed or lost cubs by the mother, or as a greeting or courtship between adults. The cheetah's chirp is similar to the soft roar of the lion, and its churr as the latter's loud roar.
 Churring (or churtling): A churr is a shrill, staccato call that can last up to two seconds. Churring and chirping have been noted for their similarity to the soft and loud roars of the lion. It is produced in similar context as chirping, but a study of feeding cheetahs found chirping to be much more common.
 Purring: Similar to purring in domestic cats but much louder, it is produced when the cheetah is content, and as a form of greeting or when licking one another. It involves continuous sound production alternating between egressive and ingressive airstreams.
 Agonistic sounds: These include bleating, coughing, growling, hissing, meowing and moaning (or yowling). A bleat indicates distress, for instance when a cheetah confronts a predator that has stolen its kill. Growls, hisses and moans are accompanied by multiple, strong hits on the ground with the front paw, during which the cheetah may retreat by a few metres. A meow, though a versatile call, is typically associated with discomfort or irritation.
 Other vocalisations: Individuals can make a gurgling noise as part of a close, amicable interaction. A "nyam nyam" sound may be produced while eating. Apart from chirping, mothers can use a repeated "ihn ihn" is to gather cubs, and a "prr prr" is to guide them on a journey. A low-pitched alarm call is used to warn the cubs to stand still. Bickering cubs can let out a "whirr"—the pitch rises with the intensity of the quarrel and ends on a harsh note.

Another major means of communication is by scent—the male will often investigate urine-marked places (territories or common landmarks) for a long time by crouching on his forelegs and carefully smelling the place. Then he will raise his tail and urinate on an elevated spot (such as a tree trunk, stump or rock); other observing individuals might repeat the ritual. Females may also show marking behaviour but less prominently than males do. Among females, those in oestrus will show maximum urine-marking, and their excrement can attract males from far off. In Botswana, cheetahs are frequently captured by ranchers to protect livestock by setting up traps in traditional marking spots; the calls of the trapped cheetah can attract more cheetahs to the place.

Touch and visual cues are other ways of signalling in cheetahs. Social meetings involve mutual sniffing of the mouth, anus and genitals. Individuals will groom one another, lick each other's faces and rub cheeks. However, they seldom lean on or rub their flanks against each other. The tear streaks on the face can sharply define expressions at close range. Mothers probably use the alternate light and dark rings on the tail to signal their cubs to follow them.

Diet and hunting

Its primary prey are medium-sized ungulates. They are the major component of the diet in certain areas, such as Dama and Dorcas gazelles in the Sahara, impala in the eastern and southern African woodlands, springbok in the arid savannas to the south and Thomson's gazelle in the Serengeti. Smaller antelopes like the common duiker are a frequent prey in the southern Kalahari. In Namibia cheetahs are the major predators of livestock. The diet of the Asiatic cheetah consists of chinkara, desert hare, goitered gazelle, urial, wild goats and livestock; in India cheetahs used to prey mostly on blackbuck. There are no records of cheetahs killing humans. Cheetahs in the Kalahari have been reported feeding on citron melons for their water content.

Prey preferences and hunting success vary with the age, sex and number of cheetahs involved in the hunt and on the vigilance of the prey. Generally only groups of cheetahs (coalitions or mother and cubs) will try to kill larger prey; mothers with cubs especially look out for larger prey and tend to be more successful than females without cubs. Individuals on the periphery of the prey herd are common targets; vigilant prey which would react quickly on seeing the cheetah are not preferred.

Cheetahs hunt primarily throughout the day, sometimes with peaks at dawn and dusk; they tend to avoid larger predators like the primarily nocturnal lion. Cheetahs in the Sahara and Maasai Mara in Kenya hunt after sunset to escape the high temperatures of the day. Cheetahs use their vision to hunt instead of their sense of smell; they keep a lookout for prey from resting sites or low branches. The cheetah will stalk its prey, trying to conceal itself in cover, and approach as close as possible, often within  of the prey (or even farther for less alert prey). Alternatively the cheetah can lie hidden in cover and wait for the prey to come nearer. A stalking cheetah assumes a partially crouched posture, with the head lower than the shoulders; it will move slowly and be still at times. In areas of minimal cover the cheetah will approach within  of the prey and start the chase. The chase typically lasts a minute; in a 2013 study, the length of chases averaged , and the longest run measured . The cheetah can give up the chase if it is detected by the prey early or if it can not make a kill quickly. Cheetahs catch their prey by tripping it during the chase by hitting its rump with the forepaw or using the strong dewclaw to knock the prey off its balance, bringing it down with much force and sometimes even breaking some of its limbs.

To kill medium- to large-sized prey, the cheetah bites the prey's throat to suffocate it, maintaining the bite for around five minutes, within which the prey stops struggling. A bite on the nape of the neck or the snout (and sometimes on the skull) suffices to kill smaller prey. Cheetahs have an average hunting success rate of 25–40%, higher for smaller and more vulnerable prey.

Once the hunt is over, the prey is taken near a bush or under a tree; the cheetah, highly exhausted after the chase, rests beside the kill and pants heavily for five to 55 minutes. Meanwhile, cheetahs nearby, who did not take part in the hunt, might feed on the kill immediately. Groups of cheetah devour the kill peacefully, though minor noises and snapping may be observed. Cheetahs can consume large quantities of food; a cheetah at the Etosha National Park (Namibia) was found to consume as much as  within two hours. However, on a daily basis, a cheetah feeds on around  meat. Cheetahs, especially mothers with cubs, remain cautious even as they eat, pausing to look around for fresh prey or for predators who may steal the kill.

Cheetahs move their heads from side to side so the sharp carnassial teeth tear the flesh, which can then be swallowed without chewing. They typically begin with the hindquarters, and then progress toward the abdomen and the spine. Ribs are chewed on at the ends, and the limbs are not generally torn apart while eating. Unless the prey is very small, the skeleton is left almost intact after feeding on the meat. Cheetahs might lose 10–15% of their kills to large carnivores such as hyenas and lions (and grey wolves in Iran). To defend itself or its prey, a cheetah will hold its body low to the ground and snarl with its mouth wide open, the eyes staring threateningly ahead and the ears folded backward. This may be accompanied by moans, hisses and growls, and hitting the ground with the forepaws. Cheetahs have rarely been observed scavenging kills; this may be due to vultures and spotted hyena adroitly capturing and consuming heavy carcasses within a short time.

Reproduction and life cycle

Cheetahs are induced ovulators and can breed throughout the year. Females can have their first litter at two to three years of age. Polyestrous, females have an oestrus ("heat") cycle is 12 days long on average, but it can vary from three days to a month. A female can conceive again after 17 to 20 months from giving birth, or even sooner if a whole litter is lost. Males can breed at less than two years of age in captivity, but this may be delayed in the wild until the male acquires a territory. A 2007 study showed that females who gave birth to more litters early in their life often died younger, indicating a trade-off between longevity and yearly reproductive success.

Urine-marking in males can become more pronounced when a female in their vicinity comes into oestrus. Males, sometimes even those in coalitions, fight among one another to secure access to the female. Often one male will eventually win dominance over the others and mate with the female, though a female can mate with different males. Mating begins with the male approaching the female, who lies down on the ground; individuals often chirp, purr or yelp at this time. No courtship behaviour is observed; the male immediately secures hold of the female's nape, and copulation takes place. The pair then ignore each other, but meet and copulate a few more times three to five times a day for the next two to three days before finally parting ways.

After a gestation of nearly three months, a litter of one to eight cubs is born (though those of three to four cubs are more common). Births take place at 20–25 minute intervals in a sheltered place such as thick vegetation. The eyes are shut at birth, and open in four to 11 days. Newborn cubs might spit a lot and make soft churring noises; they start walking by two weeks. Their nape, shoulders and back are thickly covered with long bluish grey hair, called a mantle, which gives them a mohawk-type appearance; this fur is shed as the cheetah grows older. A study suggested that this mane gives a cheetah cub the appearance of a honey badger, and could act as camouflage from attacks by these badgers or predators that tend to avoid them.

Compared to other felids, cheetah cubs are highly vulnerable to several predators during the first few weeks of their life. Mothers keep their cubs hidden in dense vegetation for the first two months and nurse in the early morning. The mother is extremely vigilant at this stage; she stays within  of the lair, frequently visits her cubs, moves them every five to six days, and remains with them after dark. Despite trying to make minimal noise, she cannot generally defend her litter from predators. Predation is the leading cause of mortality in cheetah cubs; a study showed that in areas with a low density of predators (such as Namibian farmlands) around 70% of the cubs make it beyond the age of 14 months, whereas in areas like the Serengeti National Park, where several large carnivores exist, the survival rate was just 17%. Deaths also occur from starvation if their mothers abandon them, fires, or pneumonia because of exposure to bad weather. Generation length of the cheetah is six years.

Cubs start coming out of the lair at two months of age, trailing after their mother wherever she goes. At this point the mother nurses less and brings solid food to the cubs; they retreat away from the carcass in fear initially, but gradually start eating it. The cubs might purr as the mother licks them clean after the meal. Weaning occurs at four to six months. To train her cubs in hunting, the mother will catch and let go of live prey in front of her cubs. Cubs' play behaviour includes chasing, crouching, pouncing and wrestling; there is plenty of agility, and attacks are seldom lethal. Playing can improve catching skills in cubs, though the ability to crouch and hide may not develop remarkably.

Cubs as young as six months try to capture small prey like hares and young gazelles. However, they may have to wait until as long as 15 months of age to make a successful kill on their own. At around 20 months, offspring become independent; mothers might have conceived again by then. Siblings may remain together for a few more months before parting ways. While females stay close to their mothers, males move farther off. The lifespan of wild cheetahs is 14 to 15 years for females, and their reproductive cycle typically ends by 12 years of age; males generally live as long as ten years.

Distribution and habitat 

Cheetahs appear to be less selective in habitat choice than other felids and inhabit a variety of ecosystems; areas with greater availability of prey, good visibility and minimal chances of encountering larger predators are preferred. They seldom occur in tropical forests. An open area with some cover, such as diffused bushes, is probably ideal for the cheetah because it needs to stalk and pursue its prey over a distance. This also minimises the risk of encountering larger carnivores. Unlike the big cats, the cheetah tends to occur in low densities typically between 0.3 and 3.0 adults per —these values are 10–30% of those reported for leopards and lions.

Cheetahs in eastern and southern Africa occur mostly in savannas like the Kalahari and Serengeti. In central, northern and western Africa cheetahs inhabit arid mountain ranges and valleys; in the harsh climate of the Sahara, cheetahs prefer high mountains, which receive more rainfall than the surrounding desert. The vegetation and water resources in these mountains supports antelopes.

Historical range

In prehistoric times, the cheetah was distributed throughout Africa, Asia and Europe. It gradually fell to extinction in Europe, possibly because of competition with the lion. Today the cheetah has been extirpated in most of its historical range; the numbers of the Asiatic cheetah had begun plummeting since the late 1800s, long before the other subspecies started their decline. As of 2017, cheetahs occur in just nine per cent of their erstwhile range in Africa, mostly in unprotected areas.

In the past until the mid-20th century, the cheetah ranged across vast stretches in Asia, from the Arabian Peninsula in the west to the Indian subcontinent in the east, and as far north as the Aral and Caspian Seas. A few centuries ago the cheetah was abundant in India, and its range coincided with the distribution of major prey like the blackbuck. However, its numbers in India plummeted from the 19th century onward; Divyabhanusinh of the Bombay Natural History Society notes that the last three individuals in the wild were killed by Maharaja Ramanuj Pratap Singh of Surguja (a man also noted for holding a record for shooting 1,360 tigers) in 1947. The last confirmed sighting in India was of a cheetah that drowned in a well near Hyderabad in 1957. In Iran there were around 400 cheetahs before World War II, distributed across deserts and steppes to the east and the borderlands with Iraq to the west; the numbers were falling because of a decline in prey. In Iraq, cheetahs were reported from Basra in the 1920s. Conservation efforts in the 1950s stabilised the population, but prey species declined again in the wake of the Iranian Revolution (1979) and the Iran–Iraq War (1980–1988), leading to a significant contraction of the cheetah's historical range in the region.

The first survey of cheetah populations in Africa by Norman Myers in 1975 estimated a population of 15,000 individuals throughout Sub-Saharan Africa. The range covered most of eastern and southern Africa, except for the desert region on the western coast of modern-day Angola and Namibia. In the following years, as their natural habitat has been modified dramatically, cheetah populations across the region have become smaller and more fragmented.

Present distribution
The cheetah occurs mostly in eastern and southern Africa; its presence in Asia is limited to the central deserts of Iran, though there have been unconfirmed reports of sightings in Afghanistan, Iraq and Pakistan in the last few decades. The global population of cheetahs was estimated at nearly 7,100 mature individuals in 2016. The largest population of nearly 4,000 individuals is sparsely distributed over Angola, Botswana, Mozambique, Namibia, South Africa and Zambia. Another population in Kenya and Tanzania comprises about 1,000 individuals. All other cheetahs occur in small, fragmented groups of less than 100 individuals each. Populations are feared to be declining.

Threats
The cheetah is threatened by several factors, like habitat loss and fragmentation of populations. Habitat loss is caused mainly by the introduction of commercial land use, such as agriculture and industry. It is further aggravated by ecological degradation, like bush encroachment, which is common in southern Africa. Moreover, the species apparently requires a sizeable area to live in as indicated by its low population densities. Shortage of prey and conflict with other species such as humans and large carnivores are other major threats. The cheetah appears to be less capable of coexisting with humans than the leopard. With 76% of its range consisting of unprotected land, the cheetah is often targeted by farmers and pastoralists who attempt to protect their livestock, especially in Namibia. Illegal wildlife trade and trafficking is another problem in some places (like Ethiopia). Some tribes, like the Maasai people in Tanzania, have been reported to use cheetah skins in ceremonies. Roadkill is another threat, especially in areas where roads have been constructed near natural habitat or protected areas. Cases of roadkill involving cheetahs have been reported from Kalmand, Touran National Park, and Bafq in Iran. The reduced genetic variability makes cheetahs more vulnerable to diseases; however, the threat posed by infectious diseases may be minor, given the low population densities and hence a reduced chance of infection.

Conservation
The cheetah has been classified as Vulnerable by the IUCN; it is listed under AppendixI of the CMS and AppendixI of CITES. The Endangered Species Act enlists the cheetah as Endangered.

In Africa

Until the 1970s, cheetahs and other carnivores were frequently killed to protect livestock in Africa. Gradually the understanding of cheetah ecology increased and their falling numbers became a matter of concern. The De Wildt Cheetah and Wildlife Centre was set up in 1971 in South Africa to provide care for wild cheetahs regularly trapped or injured by Namibian farmers. By 1987, the first major research project to outline cheetah conservation strategies was underway. The Cheetah Conservation Fund, founded in 1990 in Namibia, put efforts into field research and education about cheetahs on the global platform. The CCF runs a cheetah genetics laboratory, the only one of its kind, in Otjiwarongo (Namibia); "Bushblok" is an initiative to restore habitat systematically through targeted bush thinning and biomass utilisation. Several more cheetah-specific conservation programmes have since been established, like Cheetah Outreach in South Africa.

The Global Cheetah Action Plan Workshop in 2002 laid emphasis on the need for a rangewide survey of wild cheetahs to demarcate areas for conservation efforts and on creating awareness through training programs. The Range Wide Conservation Program for Cheetah and African Wild Dogs (RWCP) began in 2007 as a joint initiative of the IUCN Cat and Canid Specialist Groups, the Wildlife Conservation Society and the Zoological Society of London. National conservation plans have been developed successfully for several African countries. In 2014, the CITES Standing Committee recognised the cheetah as a "species of priority" in their strategies in northeastern Africa to counter wildlife trafficking. In December 2016 the results of an extensive survey detailing the distribution and demography of cheetahs throughout the range were published; the researchers recommended listing the cheetah as Endangered on the IUCN Red List.

The cheetah was reintroduced in Malawi in 2017.

In Asia

In 2001, the Iranian government collaborated with the CCF, the IUCN, Panthera Corporation, UNDP and the Wildlife Conservation Society on the Conservation of Asiatic Cheetah Project (CACP) to protect the natural habitat of the Asiatic cheetah and its prey. In 2004, the Iranian Centre for Sustainable Development (CENESTA) conducted an international workshop to discuss conservation plans with local stakeholders. Iran declared 31August as National Cheetah Day in 2006. The Iranian Cheetah Strategic Planning meet in 2010 formulated a five-year conservation plan for Asiatic cheetahs. The CACP Phase II was implemented in 2009, and the third phase was drafted in 2018.

During the early 2000s scientists from the Centre for Cellular and Molecular Biology (Hyderabad) proposed a plan to clone Asiatic cheetahs from Iran for reintroduction in India, but Iran denied the proposal. In September 2009, the Minister of Environment and Forests assigned the Wildlife Trust of India and the Wildlife Institute of India with examining the potential of importing African cheetahs to India. Kuno Wildlife Sanctuary and Nauradehi Wildlife Sanctuary were suggested as reintroduction sites for the cheetah because of their high prey density. However, plans for reintroduction were stalled in May 2012 by the Supreme Court of India because of a political dispute and concerns over introducing a non-native species to the country. Opponents stated the plan was "not a case of intentional movement of an organism into a part of its native range". On 28 January 2020, the Supreme Court allowed the central government to introduce cheetahs to a suitable habitat in India on an experimental basis to see if they can adapt to it. In July 2022, it was announced that eight cheetahs would be transferred from Namibia to India in August. In 2020, India signed a memorandum of understanding with Namibia as part of Project Cheetah. Eight cheetahs have been donated by Namibia that will be introduced to the Kuno National Park. The eight cheetahs were released into Kuno on September 17th, 2022 by Prime Minister Narendra Modi.

Interaction with humans

Taming

The cheetah shows little aggression toward humans, and can be tamed easily, as it has been since antiquity. The earliest known depictions of the cheetah are from the Chauvet Cave in France, dating back to 32,000–26,000 BC. According to historians such as Heinz Friederichs and Burchard Brentjes, the cheetah was first tamed in Sumer and this gradually spread out to central and northern Africa, from where it reached India. However, Thomas Allsen argues that the depicted animal might be a large dog. Other historians, such as Frederick Zeuner, have opined that ancient Egyptians were the first to tame the cheetah, from where it gradually spread into central Asia, Iran and India.

In comparison, theories of the cheetah's taming in Egypt are stronger and include timelines proposed on this basis. Mafdet, one of the ancient Egyptian deities worshiped during the First Dynasty (3100–2900BC), was sometimes depicted as a cheetah. Ancient Egyptians believed the spirits of deceased pharaohs were taken away by cheetahs. Reliefs in the Deir el-Bahari temple complex tell of an expedition by Egyptians to the Land of Punt during the reign of Hatshepsut (1507–1458BC) that fetched, among other things, animals called "panthers". During the New Kingdom (16th to 11th centuries BC), cheetahs were common pets for royalty, who adorned them with ornate collars and leashes. The Egyptians would use their dogs to bring the concealed prey out in the open, after which a cheetah would be set upon it to kill it. Rock carvings depicting cheetahs dating back to 2000–6000 years ago have been found in Twyfelfontein; little else has been discovered in connection to the taming of cheetahs (or other cats) in southern Africa.

Hunting cheetahs are known in pre-Islamic Arabic art from Yemen. Hunting with cheetahs became more prevalent toward the seventh centuryAD. In the Middle East, the cheetah would accompany the nobility to hunts in a special seat on the back of the saddle. Taming was an elaborate process and could take a year to complete. The Romans may have referred to the cheetah as the leopardos (λεοπάρδος) or leontopardos (λεοντόπαρδος), believing it to be a hybrid between a leopard and a lion because of the mantle seen in cheetah cubs and the difficulty of breeding them in captivity. A Roman hunting cheetah is depicted in a 4th century mosaic from Lod, Israel. Cheetahs continued to be used into the Byzantine period of the Roman empire, with "hunting leopards" being mentioned in the Cynegetica (283/284 AD).

In eastern Asia, records are confusing as regional names for the leopard and the cheetah may be used interchangeably. The earliest depiction of cheetahs from eastern Asia dates back to the Tang dynasty (7th to 10th centuriesAD); paintings depict tethered cheetahs and cheetahs mounted on horses. Chinese emperors would use cheetahs and caracals as gifts. In the 13th and the 14th centuries, the Yuan rulers bought numerous cheetahs from the western parts of the empire and from Muslim merchants. According to the Ming Shilu, the subsequent Ming dynasty (14th to 17th centuries) continued this practice. Tomb figurines from the Mongol empire, dating back to the reign of Kublai Khan (1260–1294 AD), represent cheetahs on horseback. The Mughal ruler Akbar the Great (1556–1605 AD) is said to have kept as many as 1000 khasa (imperial) cheetahs. His son Jahangir wrote in his memoirs, Tuzk-e-Jahangiri, that only one of them gave birth. Mughal rulers trained cheetahs and caracals in a similar way as the western Asians, and used them to hunt game, especially blackbuck. The rampant hunting severely affected the populations of wild animals in India; by 1927, cheetahs had to be imported from Africa.

In captivity

The first cheetah to be brought into captivity in a zoo was at the Zoological Society of London in 1829. Early captive cheetahs showed a high mortality rate, with an average lifespan of 3–4 years. After trade of wild cheetahs was delimited by the enforcement of CITES in 1975, more efforts were put into breeding in captivity; in 2014 the number of captive cheetahs worldwide was estimated at 1730 individuals, with 87% born in captivity.

Mortality under captivity is generally high; in 2014, 23% of the captive cheetahs worldwide died under one year of age, mostly within a month of birth. Deaths result from several reasons—stillbirths, birth defects, cannibalism, hypothermia, maternal neglect, and infectious diseases. Compared to other felids, cheetahs need specialised care because of their higher vulnerability to stress-induced diseases; this has been attributed to their low genetic variability and factors of captive life. Common diseases of cheetahs include feline herpesvirus, feline infectious peritonitis, gastroenteritis, glomerulosclerosis, leukoencephalopathy, myelopathy, nephrosclerosis and veno-occlusive disease. High density of cheetahs in a place, closeness to other large carnivores in enclosures, improper handling, exposure to public and frequent movement between zoos can be sources of stress for cheetahs. Recommended management practices for cheetahs include spacious and ample access to outdoors, stress minimisation by exercise and limited handling, and following proper hand-rearing protocols (especially for pregnant females).

Wild cheetahs are far more successful breeders than captive cheetahs; this has also been linked to increased stress levels in captive individuals. In a study in the Serengeti, females were found to have a 95% success rate in breeding, compared to 20% recorded for North American captive cheetahs in another study. On 26 November 2017, a female cheetah gave birth to eight cubs in the Saint Louis Zoo, setting a record for the most births recorded by the Association of Zoos and Aquariums. Chances of successful mating in captive males can be improved by replicating social groups such as coalitions observed in the wild.

In culture

The cheetah has been widely portrayed in a variety of artistic works. In Bacchus and Ariadne, an oil painting by the 16th-century Italian painter Titian, the chariot of the Greek god Dionysus (Bacchus) is depicted as being drawn by two cheetahs. The cheetahs in the painting were previously considered to be leopards. In 1764, English painter George Stubbs commemorated the gifting of a cheetah to George III by the English Governor of Madras, Sir George Pigot in his painting Cheetah with Two Indian Attendants and a Stag. The painting depicts a cheetah, hooded and collared by two Indian servants, along with a stag it was supposed to prey upon. The 1896 painting The Caress by the 19th-century Belgian symbolist painter Fernand Khnopff is a representation of the myth of Oedipus and the Sphinx and portrays a creature with a woman's head and a cheetah's body.

Two cheetahs are depicted standing upright and supporting a crown in the coat of arms of the Free State (South Africa).

In 1969, Joy Adamson, of Born Free fame, wrote The Spotted Sphinx, a biography of her pet cheetah Pippa. Hussein, An Entertainment, a novel by Patrick O'Brian set in the British Raj period in India, illustrates the practice of royalty keeping and training cheetahs to hunt antelopes. The book How It Was with Dooms tells the true story of a family raising an orphaned cheetah cub named Dooms in Kenya. The 2005 film Duma was based loosely on this book. The animated series ThunderCats had a character named "Cheetara", an anthropomorphic cheetah, voiced by Lynne Lipton. Comic book heroine Wonder Woman's chief adversary is Barbara Ann Minerva alias The Cheetah.

The Bill Thomas Cheetah American racing car, a Chevrolet-based coupe first designed and driven in 1963, was an attempt to challenge Carroll Shelby's Shelby Cobra in American sports car competition of the 1960s. Because only two dozen or fewer chassis were built, with only a dozen complete cars, the Cheetah was never homologated for competition beyond prototype status; its production ended in 1966. In 1986, Frito-Lay introduced Chester Cheetah, an anthropomorphic cheetah, as the mascot for their snack food Cheetos. The Mac OS X 10.0 was code-named "Cheetah".

See also
 List of largest cats

References

Further reading

External links

 
 
 
 
 

Acinonyx
Mammals of Africa
Mammals of Asia
Mammals described in 1775
Articles containing video clips
Extant Pleistocene first appearances
Big cats